Nawrahta of Kanni (also spelled) was a senior Myinsaing prince, who held important governorship positions in the rival Burmese-speaking kingdoms of Pinya and Sagaing. He was the youngest child of King Thihathu and his chief queen Mi Saw U, and the youngest brother of kings Uzana I and Kyawswa I of Pinya.

Nawrahta was given the town of Shisha in fief on 7 February 1313 by Thihathu. He remained loyal to his father's Pinya faction when the Myinsaing Kingdom split into Pinya and Sagaing kingdoms in 1315. He remained loyal to Pinya throughout the reigns of Uzana I and Sithu. On 29 March 1344, Kyawswa I succeeded the Pinya throne and appointed his younger brother Nawrahta governor of the important city of Pinle, their ancestral base. But two brothers became rivals, and in 1349, Nawrahta fled west to Sagaing where his nephew Nawrahta Minye had just become king. Nawrahta Minye appointed Nawrahta governor of Kanni.

All royal chronicles from Maha Yazawin (1724) onward identify Nawrahta of Kanni as an ancestor (maternal great-great-great grandfather) of King Bayinnaung of Toungoo Dynasty.

Notes

References

Bibliography
 
 
 
 

Myinsaing dynasty
Pinya dynasty
Sagaing dynasty